Ensign College (formerly LDS Business College) is a private college in Salt Lake City, Utah. The college is owned by the Church of Jesus Christ of Latter-day Saints (LDS Church) and operates under its Church Educational System. It also includes an Institute of Religion and is accredited by the Northwest Commission on Colleges and Universities.

History

The Salt Lake Stake Academy was founded in 1886, with high school, normal, business and college courses of study. The school had 84 students upon its opening. By 1895 was offering a four-year course of study culminating in a Ph.B. degree.

LDS University never became a fully functioning university and was displaced as the church's preeminent higher learning center by Brigham Young University in the early 20th century. The college was closely linked with Latter-day Saints High School, which counted among the graduates George W. Romney (1926) and Gordon B. Hinckley (1928).

In 1927, the name of LDS University was changed to LDS College and then to LDS Business College (LDSBC), as the other higher-education functions were gone. Two of the school's presidents were James E. Talmage and Bryant S. Hinckley.

For many years, the college was located in a former mansion several blocks east of the Salt Lake Temple, at 411 East South Temple.  As part of the LDS Church's efforts to revitalize downtown Salt Lake City, it moved to the Triad Center in 2006.

Russell M. Nelson, the LDS Church's current president, initially took classes at LDSBC but later transferred to the University of Utah to complete his studies.

The college is named after Ensign Peak, where Latter-day Saint immigrants waved a flag two days after their first arrival in the Valley of the Great Salt Lake in 1847. The college's slogan is "Developing capable and trusted disciples of Jesus Christ."

On September 1, 2020, LDSBC was renamed Ensign College. In the fall of 2021, Ensign College will begin offering four-year Bachelor of Applied Science degrees in business management, information technology, and communications.

List of presidents

The following is a list of former presidents of the institution:

 Karl G. Maeser (principal in charge): 1886–88;
 Willard Done (acting principal): 1886–88;
 James E. Talmage: 1888–92;
 Willard Done: 1892–99;
 Joshua H. Paul: 1899–1905;
 Willard Young: 1905–15;
 Guy C. Wilson: 1915–26;
 Feramorz Y. Fox: 1926–48;
 Kenneth S. Bennion: 1948–61;
 R. Ferris Kirkham: 1961–86;
 Kenneth H. Beesley: 1986–91;
 Stephen K. Woodhouse: 1992–2008;
 J. Lawrence Richards: 2008–17;
 Bruce C. Kusch: 2017–present

See also

 List of colleges and universities in Utah
 LDS Philanthropies

References

Bibliography
 Beesley, K. H. (1992). LDS Business College. In D. H. Ludlow (Ed.), Encyclopedia of Mormonism. New York: Macmillan.

External links

 Official website

1886 establishments in Utah Territory
Church Educational System
Education in Salt Lake City
Educational institutions established in 1886
Properties of the Church of Jesus Christ of Latter-day Saints
The Church of Jesus Christ of Latter-day Saints in Utah
Universities and colleges accredited by the Northwest Commission on Colleges and Universities
Universities and colleges affiliated with the Church of Jesus Christ of Latter-day Saints
Universities and colleges in Salt Lake County, Utah
Private universities and colleges in Utah